Magnitka may refer to:
Magnitka (urban-type settlement), an urban locality (a work settlement) in Chelyabinsk Oblast, Russia
Magnitka, informal name of Magnitogorsk Iron and Steel Works, in Russia
2094 Magnitka, a main belt asteroid